Lithuanian sportspeople are Lithuanian athletes who have attained outstanding achievements in sports. The criteria for inclusion in this list are:
1–3 places winners at major international tournaments;
for team sports, winning in preliminary competitions of finals at major international tournaments, or playing for several seasons for clubs of major national leagues; or
holders of past and current world records.

Athletes

American football 
Arunas Vasys

Athletics (Track and Field) 

Virgilijus Alekna
Ana Ambrazienė
Laimutė Baikauskaitė
Eglė Balčiūnaitė
Živilė Balčiūnaitė
Vilma Bardauskienė
Darius Draudvila
Lina Grinčikaitė
Martynas Jurgilas
Saulius Kleiza
Irina Krakoviak
Rišardas Malachovskis
Antanas Mikėnas
Galina Murašova
Remigija Nazarovienė
Airinė Palšytė
Rita Ramanauskaitė
Nijolė Sabaitė
Rytis Sakalauskas
Kristina Saltanovič
Zinaida Sendriūtė
Austra Skujytė
Kęstutis Šapka
Donatas Škarnulis
Tadas Šuškevičius
Sonata Tamošaitytė
Romas Ubartas
Remigijus Valiulis
Nelė Žilinskienė
Viktorija Žemaitytė
Andrius Gudžius

Basketball 

Dainius Adomaitis
Jonas Valančiūnas
Romanas Brazdauskis
Stepas Butautas
Valdemaras Chomičius
Darius Dimavičius
Vladas Garastas
Vidas Ginevičius
Giedrius Gustas
Žydrūnas Ilgauskas
Simas Jasaitis
Šarūnas Jasikevičius
Paulius Jankūnas
Robertas Javtokas
Sergejus Jovaiša
Andrius Jurkūnas
Artūras Karnišovas
Mantas Kalnietis
Rimantas Kaukėnas
Gintaras Krapikas
Gintaras Einikis
Linas Kleiza
Tadas Klimavičius
Rimas Kurtinaitis
Darjuš Lavrinovič
Kšyštof Lavrinovič
Pranas Lubinas
Darius Lukminas
Arvydas Macijauskas
Jonas Mačiulis
Šarunas Marčiulionis
Gvidonas Markevičius
Darius Maskoliūnas
Modestas Paulauskas
Tomas Pačėsas
Alvydas Pazdrazdis
Virginijus Praškevičius
Angelė Rupšienė
Arvydas Sabonis
Dainius Salenga
Antanas Sireika
Donatas Slanina
Darius Songaila
Kęstutis Šeštokas
Ramūnas Šiškauskas
Saulius Štombergas
Mindaugas Timinskas
Rytis Vaišvila
Arūnas Visockas 
Eurelijus Žukauskas
Mindaugas Žukauskas
Deividas Sirvydis
Ignas Brazdeikis
Donatas Motiejūnas
Mindaugas Kuzminskas
Domantas Sabonis
Martynas Andriuškevičius

Biathlon 
Diana Rasimovičiūtė
Algimantas Šalna
Tomas Kaukėnas

Boxing 
Egidijus Kavaliauskas
Jonas Čepulis
Jaroslavas Jakšto
Ričardas Kuncaitis
Evaldas Petrauskas
Danas Pozniakas
Daugirdas Šemiotas
Ričardas Tamulis

Cycling 

Artūras Kasputis
Ignatas Konovalovas
Simona Krupeckaitė
Jolanta Polikevičiūtė
Rasa Polikevičiūtė
Edita Pučinskaitė
Vilija Sereikaitė
Gintautas Umaras
Zita Urbonaitė
Laima Zilporytė
Diana Žiliūtė

Canoeing 
Egidijus Balčiūnas
Vladislavas Česiūnas
Alvydas Duonėla
Tomas Gadeikis
Raimundas Labuckas
Jevgenijus Šuklinas

Figure skating 
Povilas Vanagas

Football 
Arvydas Janonis
Arminas Narbekovas

Handball    
Sigita Mažeikaitė-Strečen   
Voldemaras Novickis
Aidenas Malašinskas
Jonas Truchanovičius

Ice hockey 
Dainius Zubrus
Darius Kasparaitis
Mantas Armalis
Nerijus Ališauskas

Judo       
Marius Paškevičius
Santa Pakenytė

Modern Pentathlon 
Laura Asadauskaitė 
Edvinas Krungolcas
Stasys Šaparnis
Andrejus Zadneprovskis

Orienteering 
Dainora Alšauskaitė
Svajūnas Ambrazas
Ramunė Arlauskienė
Simonas Krėpšta
Vilma Rudzenskaitė
Ieva Sargautytė
Indrė Valaitė
Giedrė Voverienė
Edgaras Voveris

Poker 
Tony G

Race driving 
Rokas Baciuška
Kazim Vasiliauskas

Rowing 
Antanas Bagdonavičius
Vytautas Briedis
Vytautas Butkus
Mindaugas Griškonis
Zigmas Jukna
Eleonora Kaminskaitė
Klavdija Koženkova
Rolandas Maščinskas
Jonas Narmontas
Jonas Pinskus
Kristina Poplavskaja
Genovaitė Ramoškienė
Birutė Šakickienė

Sailing 
Gintarė Scheidt

Shooting 
Daina Gudzinevičiūtė

Skiing 
Vida Vencienė

Strongman sport 

Vidas Blekaitis
Žydrūnas Savickas

Swimming 
Saulius Binevičius
Rolandas Gimbutis
Darius Grigalionis
Vytautas Janušaitis
Lina Kačiušytė
Raimundas Mažuolis
Ruta Meilutyte
Giedrius Titenis
Robertas Žulpa

Table tennis 
Rūta Paškauskienė

Tennis 
Ričardas Berankis
 Daniel Prenn (1904–1991) - Vilnius-born German, Polish, and British world-top-ten tennis player

Volleyball 
Vasilijus Matuševas

Weightlifting  
Aurimas Didžbalis
Žygimantas Stanulis
Ramūnas Vyšniauskas

Wrestling 
Mindaugas Ežerskis
Aleksandr Kazakevič
Mindaugas Mizgaitis
Edgaras Venckaitis
Valdemaras Venckaitis

See also 
Sport in Lithuania

 
Lithuania